NLC may refer to:

Places
 Naliya Cantt, the station code for a railway station in Northern India
 New London (Amtrak station), Connecticut, United States; Amtrak station code NLC.

Fictional locations
 "New Leaf City", a part of the MMORPG MapleStory.

Schools
 North Lake College, a Dallas County Community College.
 Northeast Lakeview College, a community college and member college of the Alamo Colleges in the San Antonio, Texas metropolitan area.
 Northwest Lineman College

Companies, organizations, departments
 The National Labor Committee, an American NGO working for sweatshop labor reform in Asia and Central/South America
 National Leadership Conference, the largest conference of the year of FBLA-PBL
 National League of Cities, an advocacy organization in the United States representing 19,495 cities
 National Liaison Committee for International Students in Australia
 National Liberal Club, a London gentlemen's club
 National Liberation Council, the government in Ghana from 1966 to 1969
 National Library of China, the national library in Beijing
 National Lottery Commission, a non departmental public body which regulates and licenses the UK National Lottery
 National Lutheran Council, a former association of Lutheran churches in the United States
 Ndola Lime Company Limited, a Zambian company
 Nebraska Library Commission
 Newfoundland and Labrador Liquor Corporation
 Neo-Luciferian Church
 New Leaders Council Leading progressive leadership training institute in North America
 New Line Cinema film studio
 Neyveli Lignite Corporation, a lignite mining and power generating company in India
 Nigeria Labour Congress
 Northern Land Council, an Aboriginal organisation in the Northern Territory of Australia

Other uses
 National League Central, a division in Major League Baseball
 National Location Code, a numerical code assigned to revenue-generating locations on the British railway network for accounting and ticket-issuing purposes
 Natural language and computation
 Nematic Liquid Crystal
 Newton's Law of Cooling
 Next Linear Collider
 Noctilucent cloud, rare bright cloudlike atmospheric phenomena visible in a deep twilight
 Nurse Licensure Compact, a multi-state agreement allowing some nurses in the United States to practice outside of their home state
 Nutrition and Lifestyle Coach

See also

 NLCS (disambiguation)